Marcus Homer Merriman (1940–2006) was an historian and academic researching Anglo-Scottish relations in the 16th century and their European context.

Background 
Merriman was born in Baltimore on 3 May 1940. Educated at Bowdoin College, Maine, and the University of Grenoble, he spent a year at Edinburgh University, then completed his PhD at the Institute of Historical Research, London University in 1971.

Career 
He spent his working life at Lancaster University as Assistant Lecturer in History (1964–66), Lecturer in History (1966–92) and Senior Lecturer in History (1992–2006). He was also Visiting Professor of History at Queens College, City University of New York and Syracuse University (1969–70), and Visiting Professor at Bowdoin College (1975–6). His published works are mostly concerned with the Anglo-Scottish war of The Rough Wooing which began following negotiations to marry Mary, Queen of Scots to Edward VI of England. He was also Associate Editor of the Sixteenth Century Journal (1979–82). In 1990, he was honoured with the Cadbury Schweppes National Award for innovation in teaching.

At Lancaster, Merriman was Vice-Principal of Pendle College and was credited for his part in the design of the college buildings. He regularly took his students on study trips to Scotland, hiring a boat to visit the ruined 16th-century fortifications on Inchkeith.

Pendle College's central building is named the Merriman Block in his honour, and the Marcus Merriman Travel Grant is awarded to successful students from Pendle College. The purpose of the grant being to enable students to travel in order to take part in a project that would broaden their experience and provide a benefit to others.

Publications
 
 
 
 
 
 
  also

References

1940 births
2006 deaths
Writers from Baltimore
Academics of Lancaster University
Principals of Pendle College, Lancaster
20th-century British historians
Historians of Scotland
American emigrants to the United Kingdom
Bowdoin College alumni